Pyramus is a character in Greek mythology.

Pyramus may also refer to:

 Pyramus, a historical name for the Ceyhan River in Turkey
 14871 Pyramus, an asteroid
 , two Royal Navy ships
 Denis Pyramus, 12th-13th century Anglo-Norman Benedictine monk and poet

See also
 Bayerotrochus pyramus, commonly called the pyramus slit shell, a species of large sea snail
 Poecilmitis pyramus, also known as the Pyramus opal, a species of butterfly